The Orlat is a right tributary of the river Săliște in Romania. It flows into the Săliște in the village Orlat.

References

Rivers of Romania
Rivers of Sibiu County